Chocolate City may refer to:

 Chocolate City (album), a 1975 album by Parliament
 Chocolate City (film), a 2015 film
 Chocolate City: Vegas Strip, a 2017 sequel
 Chocolate City, a 1994 film by Rob Hardy
 "Chocolate City" (song), a 1975 song from the album Chocolate City
 Chocolate City (music label), a Nigeria-based record label
 Chocolate City Records, a defunct U.S. record label
 Chocolate City speech, a 2006 speech by New Orleans mayor Ray Nagin
 Chocolate City, Liberia, a district of Monrovia
 Hershey, Pennsylvania, home of The Hershey Company
 Washington, D.C., capital of the United States